Waheeda Akhtar (born 10 April 1995) is a Pakistani cricketer.

References

External links
 

1995 births
Living people
Pakistani women cricketers